Mission College Preparatory Catholic High School is a private Roman Catholic high school in San Luis Obispo, California, United States. It is located in the Roman Catholic Diocese of Monterey.

Remodelings and additions
In 2004, Mission College Prep (MCP) underwent a major renovation. An entire new wing was built over the parking lot, which was remade into an underground parking facility. Included in this add-on is the Cowitz Gymnasium. The previous gym was transformed into a performing arts auditorium.

In the summer of 2007 MCP tore out and replaced the football, soccer, and baseball field. This action was done to accommodate the change from 8-man to 11-man football. In addition a removable dugout was placed alongside the field to allow both football and baseball to be played on the same field.

In the summer of 2008 the sections of MCP not renovated in 2004 were retrofitted. Some of the school's older classrooms were also remodeled.

Athletics
Mission Prep has sport programs for: football, cross country running, tennis, softball, volleyball, basketball, soccer, golf, swim and dive, track and field, and baseball. The school's mascot is the Royals.

Mission Prep is frequently in the CIF playoffs, holding many banners for basketball, volleyball, soccer, and cross country running. Among their star athletes was Jordan Hasay.

Mission Prep currently holds the CIF record for most consecutive CIF championships in any sport with 16 straight in girls basketball. Mission hosts an annual basketball tournament known as the "Christmas Classic." In this tournament, teams from across the country have come to play.

Starting in the 2018-19 season, Mission Prep, as well as other Central Coast Athletic Association schools, had moved to the CIF Central Section. In the 2018-19 football season, Mission Prep cruised to the CIF Central Section 8-Man title, with an undefeated season, the first sectional title for football in school history. In 2018-19, the women’s tennis team also won a CIF Central Section title, their first as well.

In November 2017, a student accused a school administrator of assault and placing them in a carotid chokehold from behind. The administrator was placed on administrative leave after his alleged victim was granted a temporary restraining order. The local police department sent a report of the incident to the district attorney's office for review. In April 2018, the San Luis Obispo County District Attorney declined to indict the administrator.

The Painting of The M
Every year a majority of the incoming freshmen hike up Cerro San Luis to repaint the giant cement M on the mountain's east face. This traditionally ends with the students throwing excess paint at each other.

This M has been around for nearly 40 years and was built by Raymond Cattaneo his senior year. The removal of the M has been brought before the City Council of San Luis Obispo. Each time it has been shut down by an outcry from the students at Mission along with a large number of alumni.

Notable alumni
 Dylan Beavers, 2022 Baltimore Orioles draft choice 
 Jordan Hasay professional middle distance cross-country and track runner.
 Patrick Laird, NFL running back for the Tampa Bay Bucs
 Kat Suderman, professional basketball center (Apollon Kalamarias B.C.)
 Bassith Yessoufou, professional basketball forward (Al Sadd)

Notes and references

External links
 

Catholic secondary schools in California
Roman Catholic Diocese of Monterey in California
High schools in San Luis Obispo County, California